Răzvan Marian Negrescu (born 9 August 1995) is a Romanian professional footballer who plays as a defender.

References

External links
 
 

1995 births
Living people
Sportspeople from Târgu Jiu
Romanian footballers
Association football defenders
Liga I players
CS Pandurii Târgu Jiu players